Linus Persson (born 16 April 1993) is a Swedish handball player. He plays for HBC Nantes and the Swedish national team.

He competed at the 2016 European Championship, and in the 2021 World Championship.

References

1993 births
Living people
Swedish male handball players
21st-century Swedish people